Johannes Finne Brun (10 March 1832 – 7 March 1890) was a Norwegian stage actor.

Brun was born in Verdal. He made his stage debut as the character "Henrik" in Holberg's comedy Den Vægelsindede on 2 January 1850, at the first ordinary performance at Ole Bull's Det norske Theater in Bergen. He was married to actress Louise Brun (née Gulbrandsen) in 1851. From 1857 both Brun and his wife played at Christiania Theatre.

Brun is regarded among the most important Norwegian actors of his time.

Bibliography

References

1832 births
1890 deaths
19th-century Norwegian male actors
Norwegian male stage actors
People from Verdal